Juanmi  may refer to:

 Juanmi (footballer, born 1993), Spanish footballer who plays for Real Betis as a forward
 Juanmi Callejón (born 1987), Spanish professional footballer
 Juanmi (footballer, born 1971), Spanish retired footballer who played as a goalkeeper
 Juanmi Gelabert (born 1972),  Spanish retired footballer who played as a central or left defender
 178256 Juanmi, an asteroid